Ali Shahedan (also Romanized as ‘Alī Shāhedān and Alī Shāhedān) is a village in Garkan-e Shomali Rural District, Pir Bakran District, Falavarjan County, Isfahan Province, Iran. At the 2006 census, its population was 1,367, in 364 families.

References 

Populated places in Falavarjan County